Christian Pedersen Horrebow (15 April 1718 – 15 September 1776) was a Danish astronomer of the 18th century.  He was a son of Peder Horrebow, whom he succeeded as director of the observatory associated with the University of Copenhagen.
He was himself suddeeded by Thomas Bugge.

Neith, a supposed moon of Venus, was spotted by Christian Horrebow, while he was studying this planet from 1766 to 1768.  He also discovered the periodicity of sunspots.

References

Sources
Astronomy in Denmark

18th-century Danish astronomers
1718 births
1776 deaths
Burials at the Church of Our Lady, Copenhagen